Jón Sveinbjørn Jónsson (28 June 1955 – 21 November 2008) was a Norwegian poet, children's writer and translator, of Icelandic citizenship (Icelandic name Jón Sveinbjörn Pétursson), born and raised in Norway.

He made his literary debut in 1973 with the poetry collection Manus. Among his children's books are Pelle Parafins Bøljeband: Serum, serum (1981) and Håkon Håkonsson (1990). Jónsson was part of the poetic activist group "Stuntpoetene" during the 1980s, along with Karin Moe, Triztán Vindtorn, Arne Ruste, Thorvald Steen, Erling Kittelsen, Torgeir Rebolledo Pedersen and others. He died in November 2008.

Bibliography
Manus (1973) (poetry)
Høstbok (1976) (poetry)
Historier i oktober (1979) (poetry)
Fartøy (1999) (poetry)
Det spesielle grep om fjærpennen (2007) (texts by Olav Angell; edited by Jónsson)

References

External links

1955 births
2008 deaths
20th-century Norwegian poets
Norwegian male poets
Norwegian children's writers
Icelandic emigrants to Norway
20th-century Norwegian male writers